La moda or La Moda may refer to:

La Moda, an Argentine women's journal of the 1830s founded by Juan Bautista Alberdi
La moda, a 1761 comic opera by Antonio Boroni, to a libretto by Pietro Cipretti 
La moda, a 1771 comic opera pasticcio with music by Antonio Salieri and others, to the same libretto by Pietro Cipretti 
La Moda, a 2005 album by Yaga & Mackie
La moda (Garbo album), 2012

See also
 Moda (disambiguation)